Charles Tambu (1907-1965) was a representative of the Indonesian government in international diplomacy even though he was not a native Indonesian by descent. He is best known for being one of Indonesia's representatives at the UN security session held on August 14, 1947, together with Soedjatmoko, Soemitro Djojohadikusumo, Sutan Sjahrir, H. Agus Salim, and L. N. Palar.

Biography 
Charles Tambu is of Tamil descent, his parents were immigrants from Ceylon (now Sri Lanka). Although he is not a native Indonesian, he has defended the name of Indonesia in various international forums.

His sympathy for Indonesia, as well as the moral support and knowledge he gave for the struggle of the Indonesian people, had moved President Sukarno to give him an Indonesian passport. After the recognition of Indonesian sovereignty by the Dutch in 1949, Tambu was appointed by President Sukarno to be the Indonesian Consul General in Manila until 1953.

References 

1907 births
1965 deaths
Indonesian politicians
Indonesian diplomats
Indonesian people of Sri Lankan descent
Indonesian people of Tamil descent